Łukowo may refer to the following places:
Łukowo, Oborniki County in Greater Poland Voivodeship (west-central Poland)
Łukowo, Wągrowiec County in Greater Poland Voivodeship (west-central Poland)
Łukowo, Masovian Voivodeship (east-central Poland)
Łukowo, Pomeranian Voivodeship (north Poland)

See also
 Łuków, a city in eastern Poland
 Łuków County, whose seat is Łuków